Jana fletcheri is a moth in the family Eupterotidae. It was described by Lucien A. Berger in 1980. It is found in Burundi, the Democratic Republic of the Congo and Kenya.

References

Moths described in 1980
Janinae